Where the Wild Things Are is the debut album by British band Agent Provocateur. The song "Red Tape" was featured in The Jackal and on the original score of the Underworld soundtrack.

Track listing
 "Red Tape" (5:20)  	    	  
 "Spinning" (3:45) 	  	 
 "Agent Dan" (5:28) 	  	 
 "Kicks" (5:00) 	  	 
 "You're No Good" (2:56) 	  	 
 "Sabotage" (4:38) 	  	 
 "Elvis Economics" (7:41) 	  	 
 "Sandpit" (4:50) 	  	 
 "Hercules" (4:02) 	  	 
 "Dumb" (3:44) 	  	 
 "Red Tape" (the Janitor Remix) (6:08) 	  	 
 "Agent Dan" (Propellerheads Remix) (4:48) 	  	 
 "Sabotage" (Monkey Mafia Bastard Remix) (6:43) 	  	 
 "Dumb" (Mekon Remix) (4:41)

Personnel
Agent Provocateur 
Cleo Torres - vocals
 Matthew Ashman - guitar, bass guitar, Vox organ, backing vocals
 Danny Saber - guitar, bass guitar, keyboards, beats
 Dan Peppe - bass guitar
 John Gosling - keyboards, breaks, scratches 
 Neil Conti - drums
 Ged Lynch - percussion, drums
with:
Shaun Ryder - vocals on "Agent Dan"
Mad Frankie Fraser - vocals on "Sandpit"
 Mark Rutherford - keyboards on "Red Tape"
Joe Strummer - guitar on "Dumb"
Jim Whelan - guitar on "Spinning" and "You're No Good"
Simon "Palmskin" Richmond - drums on "You're No Good"
Dominic Evans - vocals on "Dumb"
Technical
 Mark Baker - photography
 Robert Hill - engineer
Jon Carter - remixing

References

External links
 Album review at Artistdirect.com
 Video of "Sabotage"

1997 debut albums
Agent Provocateur (band) albums
Wall of Sound (record label) albums